Eißendorf is a quarter of Hamburg, Germany, in the borough of Harburg. More than 24,300 inhabitants live in an area of 8.4 km2.

Geography
Eißendorf borders the quarters of Heimfeld, Harburg, Wilstorf, and Marmstorf. Eißendorf is located in an undulating landscape at the northern edge of Harburg Hills. Its center, marked by the main road of Eißendorfer Straße, is situated in the valley of Göhlbachtal.

History
In 1332/33, the former village of Eißendorf, in 1450 called Eytzen-dorpe, was first mentioned. Eißendorf has been a Haufendorf (lit. clustered village), probably named after its founding settler. Eißendorf belonged to Province of Hanover in Prussia, until the village was incorporated into Hamburg in 1937 by the Greater Hamburg Act, which came into force in 1938.

Politics
These are the results of Eißendorf in the Hamburg state election:

References

External links

 Eißendorf, Hamburg.de

Quarters of Hamburg
Harburg, Hamburg